D2 state road is a trunk state road in the northern areas of Croatia that spans from the border crossing with Slovenia at Dubrava Križovljanska in the west via Varaždin, Koprivnica, Virovitica, Našice, Osijek, Vukovar, ending at the Ilok–Bačka Palanka Bridge border crossing with Serbia.

Route description 
Most of the D2 route runs parallel to the Drava River which is why it is often called the Drava River valley highway. However, east of Osijek as the Drava River flows into the Danube, the D2 road follows that river to its eastern terminus near Ilok. The D2 road connects either directly or via short connectors to the A4 and A5 motorways at Varaždin and Ludbreg (A4) and Osijek (A5) interchanges. The road is also parallel to the A3 motorway further to the south. As it does not reach the capital Zagreb nor shares designation with any of the major Pan-European corridors, it carries a more moderate volume of passenger and freight traffic, but it is still often used as an alternative to the tolled motorway. Two further connections of the D2 state road to Croatian motorway network were planned: to the A12 and A13 motorways near Koprivnica and Virovitica respectively. However the Government of Croatia cancelled construction of the two motorways in June 2012.

Parts of the D2 state road are used as southern bypass of Varaždin and Osijek and those sections of the road are more recently built than most of the route, as the D2 originally ran through the two cities. As of 2007 there were plans to upgrade the Osijek southern bypass to an expressway by construction of an additional carriageway, especially since all junctions along the section are already grade separated. In September 2011, the expansion construction works were formally opened: The works are scheduled to be completed in 30 months and they comprise an additional  carriageway, adaptation of the existing interchanges and construction of a new interchange along the section. The works comprise the D2 section between interchanges with the A5 motorway and the Ž4091 road.

Most of the D2 road also runs parallel to railway tracks. Currently, the only part of the D2 road that has been upgraded to expressway standards is the Osijek southern bypass between Josipovac and Tenjska interchanges.

The road, as well as all other state roads in Croatia, is managed and maintained by Hrvatske ceste, a state-owned company.

Traffic volume 

Traffic is regularly counted and reported by Hrvatske Ceste, operator of the road. The most significant traffic volumes are recorded near Varaždin and Osijek as the D2 road serves as their southern bypass.

Road junctions and populated areas

Maps

References

D002
D002
D002
D002
D002
D002
Buildings and structures in Osijek-Baranja County